The U.S. states of Florida and Georgia have been parties to several original jurisdiction suits before the United States Supreme Court, captioned Florida v. Georgia.

 Florida v. Georgia (1855), dealing with the border between Florida and Georgia
 Florida v. Georgia (2018), dealing with water appropriation rights
 Florida v. Georgia (2021), dealing with the decision from the prior 2018 case